The 2023 Northern Arizona Lumberjacks football team will represent Northern Arizona University as a member of the Big Sky Conference during the 2023 NCAA Division I FCS football season. They Lumberjacks are led by fifth-year head coach Chris Ball and play home games at the Walkup Skydome in Flagstaff, Arizona.

Previous season

The Lumberjacks finished the 2022 season with an overall record of 3–8 and a mark of 2–6 in conference play to place in a tie for seventh in the Big Sky.

Schedule

References

Northern Arizona
Northern Arizona Lumberjacks football seasons
Northern Arizona Lumberjacks football